Extensive Music, previously Global Artist Management is a Swedish record label founded in 1993. Its base is in Stockholm. Extensive Music has sublabels: Extensive Music Sweden, Extensive Music UK and Extensive Music JLT.

Artists

Current

Former

See also
 List of record labels

References

External links

Swedish record labels
Electronic music record labels
Record labels established in 1993